The 2012 IIHF World Championship Division III was an international Ice hockey tournament run by the International Ice Hockey Federation. It was contested in Erzurum, Turkey running from April 15–21, 2012.

Participants

^ – Both Bosnia and Herzegovina and Chinese Taipei applied to participate in the Division III tournament, but the IIHF did not approve either, so Greece and Mongolia joined the other four teams for the Division III tournament.

Tournament

Standings

All times are local (UTC+3).

References

External links
IIHF Site

2012
4
2012 in Greek sport
2012 in Irish sport
2012
2012
World